Prahalad may refer to:

Prahlada, Hindu deity
C. K. Prahalad, Indian scholar